Egdon Heath, Op. 47, H. 172, subtitled "A Homage to Thomas Hardy", is a tone poem by Gustav Holst, written in 1927. Holst considered it his most perfectly realised composition.

Composition
Egdon Heath is a fictional place in the equally fictional region of Wessex in the south-west of England, where Thomas Hardy set all his major works. The novel The Return of the Native is entirely set on Egdon Heath, and it is also referred to in The Mayor of Casterbridge and the short story The Withered Arm. During the writing of the tone poem, Holst met and walked with Hardy on a real heath reminiscent of Egdon Heath, between Wool and Bere Regis in Dorset. Hardy accepted Holst's dedication of the piece to him in August 1927.

Holst included a quotation from The Return of the Native at the head of the score. He expressed the desire that the Hardy quote always appear in programme notes.

Holst calls for a normal orchestra but with extra strings and no percussion section. The work typically takes about 13–14 minutes to play.

Performances
The work was written for the New York Symphony Orchestra, in response to their commission of a symphony. The NYSO premiered it at the Mecca Temple on 12 February 1928, conducted by Walter Damrosch. Hardy had died three weeks earlier, on 11 January, and in tribute to him, an extract from The Return of the Native was read out by Paul Leyssac at the first performance.

The first British performance took place the next day, 13 February 1928, at Cheltenham, with the City of Birmingham Symphony Orchestra conducted by the composer. The first performance in London, on 23 February 1928, conducted by Václav Talich, was met with a noisy audience; the composer's daughter Imogen described the performance as disastrous. The audience applauded loudly, but according to the anonymous reviewer in The Times, it was from respect for the composer rather than from "that spontaneity which shows that a piece of music has come home to the hearers". The Manchester Guardian's critic agreed that the reception was "respectful rather than enthusiastic", but declared that nevertheless, "there is not the smallest doubt that Egdon Heath will long outwear The Planets."

Holst considered the work his most perfectly realised composition, an opinion shared by Ralph Vaughan Williams and others. But it has never had the profile of works such as The Planets and St Paul's Suite. In 1934 Edwin Evans speculated on why the public had not yet shared the composer's assessment:

Recordings

Source: WorldCat.

Notes, references and sources

Notes

References

Sources
 
 
 

Compositions by Gustav Holst
Symphonic poems
1927 compositions
Thomas Hardy